Ajay-Atul is an Indian music composer duo comprising brothers Ajay Ashok Gogavale and Atul Ashok Gogavale. They won the Best Music Direction award at the 56th National Film Awards from the Government of India for their music in the Marathi film Jogwa in 2008. They made their debut in the 2015 Forbes India Celebrity 100 List securing a position of 82 and were placed 22nd in 2019. They have composed music for many hit Marathi & Hindi films.

Early life 
Ajay and Atul were born to Ashok Gogavale, a Revenue Department officer of Alandi, Pune. They spent their childhood in several villages of western Maharashtra, such as Rajgurunagar, Junnar, Shirur, Manchar and Ghodegaon as their father had a transferable job. Atul, the elder of the brothers, was born on 11 September 1974 and Ajay, the younger of the brothers, was born on 21 August 1976.

Throughout their childhood, they were not much interested in academics. But their interest in music developed while they were still in school. Around this time, they started experimenting with music. In an NCC competition, Ajay played an existing composition differently, and they won the prize for their experiment. This instance inspired them to explore their music potential.

They did not have a musical background. Although they were not supported by their family directly for music, they were never denied any assistance. As their family could not afford the instruments for their musical endeavors, they started their musical ventures through their school, temples, local bands, etc. Despite not getting direct training, they learned a lot from these ventures. They would befriend people who owned instruments like harmoniums, mridangam, dhol etc., since they could not afford them on their own.
Later, while at college, they started working with local bands as arrangers. Their father bought them a keyboard on their mother's insistence. This proved to be one of their greatest gifts. Their father said, "You have not been given any toys during childhood, now this is your toy". This inspired them and they started experimenting.

Career as music composers 
Later, they came to Mumbai and started working on an international non-film music album "Vishwavinayaka". This proved to be a big break for them and paved the way for their foray into the Indian (mostly Marathi) music industry. They worked on many commercial jingles, ballets, and advertisements to strengthen their profile.

Man Udhān Vāryāche (मन उधाण वाऱ्याचे), Malhāravārī (मल्हारवारी), Kombdī Paḷalī (कोंबडी पळाली ) are some of their notable compositions. Ajay-Atul composed the songs and background score for the Marathi film Naṭarang (नटरंग) (2010). Their composition for Naṭarang was influenced by traditional Marathi folk music forms like Lavani (लावणी), Phaṭakā (फटका) and Tamāśā (तमाशा). They composed music for the Hindi films Singham & Bol Bachchan starring Ajay Devgan directed by Rohit Shetty and Agneepath  & Brothers produced by Karan Johar directed by Karan Malhotra. They have also contributed music to the Aamir Khan starrer PK. In 2016, they worked in Nagraj Manjule's film Sairat which is the only Marathi film to gross over 1  billion. They also composed for Manasu Mallige, the film's Kannada remake and Dhadak, the Hindi remake. They produced the Marathi film Jaundya Na Balasaheb directed by Girish Kulkarni. They composed for Tumbbad, Thugs of Hindostan, Mauli and Zero. Their first song from Zero, "Mere Naam Tu", garnered 18 million views in 24 hours on YouTube.

They were awarded as 'Composer of the Decade' in Mirchi Music Awards (Hindi) 2021 for Agneepath and Mirchi Music Awards (Marathi) 2021 for Sairat.

Almost all of their songs and albums are recorded using live instruments, the most notable of them being Agneepath, Sairat and Dhadak.

Filmography

Series/daily soaps

Plays/dramas

Awards

See also 
List of Indian film music directors

References

Living people
Music directors
Best Music Direction National Film Award winners
Marathi-language singers
1974 births
Indian musical duos
Musicians from Pune
21st-century Indian composers
Indian male film score composers
21st-century male musicians
Marathi film score composers
Male musical duos